God of Israel may refer to:

 God in Judaism, God as understood in Jewish theological discussion.
 Yahweh, the national god of the ancient kingdoms of Israel and Judah.
 Tetragrammaton, the four Hebrew letters YHWH as the name of God, and various pronunciations given to them.
 El Shaddai, one of the names of the God of Israel.

See also
 God
 God in Abrahamic religions
 God in Christianity
 God in Islam

Deities in the Hebrew Bible